2016 President's Cup may refer to:

 2016 President of Ireland's Cup, in football
 2016 President's Cup (Maldives), in football
 2016 President's Cup (tennis)